Miles Richardson (born 15 July 1963) is a British actor, born in Battersea, London to parents Ian Richardson (the well-known Shakespearean actor) and Maroussia Frank (daughter of dancer and critic Elizabeth Frank), both founder members of the Royal Shakespeare Company.

He was educated and brought up in London, Stratford-upon-Avon and New York. He graduated from Arts Educational Schools in 1982, where he won the award for Best Actor. Previously he had worked as a child actor for the Royal Shakespeare Company.

In 2009, he placed his father's ashes in the newly refurbished Royal Shakespeare Company's theatre in Stratford-upon-Avon.

Theatre work

Repertory theatre 
Richardson has worked extensively in repertory theatre throughout the United Kingdom, including Newcastle upon Tyne, York, Birmingham, Pitlochry, Mold, Flintshire, Nottingham, Leeds and Northampton. His credits number more than 70 plays including A Midsummer Night's Dream, All's Well That Ends Well, As You Like It, Candida, Journey's End, Henry V, Richard II, The Moment of Truth, Dear Brutus, Twelve Angry Men, and an adaptation by Ronald Selwyn Phillips of The Picture of Dorian Gray. He played Sherlock Holmes in Tim Heath's 1996 play Sherlock Holmes: The Adventure at Sir Arthur Sullivan's  between September and November 1996; his father also played the sleuth for television. He has also toured the U.K. most notably in Richard II & Richard III with Sir Derek Jacobi playing the title roles. James Graham's This House & Barney Norris's adaptation of Kazuo Ishiguro's The Remains Of The Day.

West End 
His West End credits include Another Country, An Evening with Gary Lineker, The Invisible Man, All's Well That Ends Well, A Midsummer Night's Dream and As You Like It. He has toured in the Far East and the United States of America, most notably in the Almeida Theatre's production of Lulu. He appeared in Anjin, an Anglo-Japanese co-production in 2009–10 in Tokyo and Osaka and again in 2012–13 in Tokyo and London; both productions were directed by Gregory Doran. From November 2013 until March 2014, he appeared as "Juror 10" in Twelve Angry Men at the Garrick Theatre. From September 2014, he appeared as James Reiss in King Charles III at the Wyndhams Theatre. In 2015 the show won the Olivier Award for Best New Play. Due to Tim Pigott-Smith sustaining a broken collarbone, he took over the lead role of Charles for 5 weeks until Pigott-Smith returned. He was in the same production at the Music Box Theatre on Broadway and the radio version for the BBC.

Royal Shakespeare Company 
From 2003 to 2008, he was a member of the Royal Shakespeare Company appearing in All's Well That Ends Well with Dame Judi Dench. He had already played with Dench in Sir Peter Hall's film version of A Midsummer Night's Dream in 1967.

He took part in the RSC's Histories Ensemble playing in Henry IV, part 1 and 2, Henry V, Henry VI, part 1, 2, and 3 and Richard III which won three Olivier Awards in 2009 for Best Company Performance, Best Revival and Best Costume Design.
He returned in 2015 to play Voltore in Volpone with Henry Goodman.

Film and television work 
He has carved himself a niche in film and television work, normally playing nasty upper class cads, butlers, priests and barristers. He acted alongside his father in Channel Four's adaptation of Porterhouse Blue in 1987, and in the BBC's The Final Cut in 1995, alongside his father. He played Frank Jefferson in Agatha Christie's Marple "The Body in the Library". He appeared in three episodes of Midsomer Murders "Tainted Fruit" (2001) as Frederick Bentine-Brown, "Country Matters" (2006) as Sir Charles and "Fit for Murder" (2011) as Dr. Giles Danby. He has had parts in 'Allo 'Allo, Doctors (three times), Maurice, The Remains of the Day, Highlander: The Raven, Hope it Rains and Dirk Gently. He was Tony Slattery's butler in Ps & Qs and Sir Roger Moore's butler in A Princess for Christmas. He voiced "Father" in Flushed Away. He was the head of the assassins' league in Terry Pratchett's The Colour of Magic. He played Charles I in The Regicides and has played his son, Charles II, twice, once on stage and once on television. He played the Duke of Kent for the Japanese television production of Jiru and John Jacob Astor in Lord Julian Fellowes' Titanic miniseries. He appeared as Harry Thornton in Stephen Poliakoff's Dancing on the Edge, The Crown, Genius, A Quiet Passion, Peterloo, Outlander and as Nick Frost's boss in Sick Note. In 2018, Richardson had a cameo role in Solo: A Star Wars Story, playing an Imperial governor who is executed by the film's antagonist.

Richardson also plays Irving Braxiatel in the long-running Bernice Summerfield and Gallifrey audio dramas by Big Finish Productions. He has provided his voice for over 100 films and video games as an ADR artist, including the 2011 From Software video game Dark Souls, in which he voiced the characters Siegmeyer of Catarina and Itinerant Merchant. Richardson reprises his role in Dark Souls III where he plays Siegward of Catarina, a very similar looking and sounding character to Siegmeyer of Catarina. Richardson has also had roles in the independent spin-off films Downtime and Daemos Rising, in both instances playing alongside his then-wife Beverly Cressman (as well as his father in the latter who provided some of the enemy voices).

Other work 
As well as acting, he has also directed theatre and film productions, been a screenwriter, freelance journalist, lecturer and teacher, specialising in the works of Shakespeare.

References

External links 

 Spotlight profile

1963 births
Living people
20th-century English male actors
21st-century English male actors
English male film actors
English male stage actors
English male television actors
English male voice actors
English people of Scottish descent
Male actors from London
People educated at St Mary's Town and Country School
People from Battersea
Royal Shakespeare Company members